Parabuthus liosoma, the African black tail scorpion, is a species of scorpions belonging to the family Buthidae.

Description
These medium-sized scorpions are yellowish to reddish-brown, with darker or black last two metasoma segments.

Distribution and habitat
This species is present in the eastern and northeastern Africa (Egypt, Ethiopia, Kenya, Somalia, Sudan, Tanzania) and in the Arabian peninsula (Saudi Arabia, Yemen). These scorpions can be found under stones and debris in arid or semi-arid desert scrubs, grassland and savannah.

References

liosoma
Scorpions of Africa
Animals described in 1828